Ieuan Dyfi (c. 1461? – after 1502?) was a Welsh language poet.

Poetry 
Very little information has survived relating to Ieuan and his poetry. Ieuan composed five poems to a woman named "Anni Goch" in one of which he accuses how false women have been throughout history. Recent research has shown that Ieuan Dyfi was brought before a church court, where he admitted adultery with Anni, a married woman. His poems about Anni provoked Gwerful Mechain to respond with her poem "I Ateb Ieuan Dyfi am gywydd Anni Goch".

References

 Smith, Llinos Beverley, 'Olrhain Anni Goch', Ysgrifau Beirniadol 19, ed. J. E. Caerwyn Williams. Dinbych: Gwasg Gee, 1993, 107-26
 Nerys Ann Howells, Gwaith Gwerful Mechain ac Eraill, University of Wales Centre for Advanced Welsh and Celtic Studies, 2001
 Andrew Breeze, 'The Bret Glascurion and Chaucer's House of Fame', The Review of English Studies, Vol. 45, No. 177, 1994
 Ceridwen Lloyd-Morgan, The "Querelle des Femmes": A Continuing Tradition in Welsh Women's Literature', Turnhout, 2000

Welsh-language poets
1460s births
1500s deaths
15th-century Welsh poets
People of the Tudor period